Mexerion is a genus of flowering plants in tribe Gnaphalieae within the family Asteraceae.

Species 
There is only one accepted species: Mexerion mexicanum, from Cerro Mohinora in the Mexican State of Chihuahua.

formerly included
see Luciliocline 
Mexerion sarmentosum (Klatt) G.L.Nesom - Luciliocline santanica (Cabrera) Anderb. & S.E.Freire

References

Gnaphalieae
Monotypic Asteraceae genera
Endemic flora of Mexico